Diane Bellemare (born October 13, 1949) is a Canadian economist and parliamentarian from Quebec, who was appointed to the Senate of Canada on September 6, 2012.

From September 2003 to April 2007, she held executive jobs with the Conseil du patronat du Québec, including Senior Vice-President and Chief Economist from April 2006 to April 2007.

Bellemare was appointed to the Senate by Governor General David Johnston on the advice of Prime Minister Stephen Harper and sat as a member of the Conservative Party of Canada caucus until March 2016 when she resigned to sit as an Independent. In May 2016, she was appointed Deputy Government Representative to the Senate by Government Representative Peter Harder.

On November 14, 2019, on the same day that the Senate Liberal Caucus dissolved and was succeeded by the Progressive Senate Group, Senator Bellemare left her position and joined the ISG.

On September 17, 2021, Senator Bellemare joined the Progressive Senate Group.

References

External links
 

1949 births
Action démocratique du Québec candidates in Quebec provincial elections
Diane
Canadian economists
Canadian senators from Quebec
Canadian women economists
Women members of the Senate of Canada
Conservative Party of Canada senators
Independent Senators Group
Living people
Academic staff of the Université du Québec à Montréal
Women in Quebec politics
21st-century Canadian politicians
21st-century Canadian women politicians